The 2001 Qatar Open, known as the 2001 Qatar ExxonMobil Open for sponsorship reasons, was a men's tennis tournament played on outdoor hard courts at the Khalifa International Tennis Complex in Doha in Qatar and was part of the International Series of the 2001 ATP Tour. It was the ninth edition of the tournament and was held from 1 January through 7 January 2001. Unseeded Marcelo Ríos won the singles title.

Finals

Singles

 Marcelo Ríos defeated  Bohdan Ulihrach 6–3, 2–6, 6–3
 It was Ríos's 1st title of the year and the 18th of his career.

Doubles

 Mark Knowles /  Daniel Nestor defeated  Juan Balcells /  Andrei Olhovskiy 6–3, 6–1
 It was Knowles's 1st title of the year and the 15th of his career. It was Nestor's 1st title of the year and the 17th of his career.

References

External links
 Official website
 ATP tournament profile

 
Qatar Open
Qatar Open
Qatar Open
Qatar Open (tennis)